The aughts (American English) or noughties (British English) are terms referring to the decade 2000 to 2009. These arise from the words aught and nought respectively, both meaning zero. 

In the English-speaking world, a name for the decade was never universally agreed on as it was for decades such as the eighties, the nineties, etc.

The noughties became a common name for the decade in the United Kingdom and in New Zealand and Australia.

Although use of the word aught to refer to zero is not widespread in the United States, the use of aughts to identify the decade became common there.

References

2000s
decades